Sidney Stranne (8 February 1886 – 3 August 1957) was a Swedish modern pentathlete and épée fencer. He competed in the modern pentathlon at the 1912 Summer Olympics and in fencing at the 1928 Summer Olympics.

References

External links
 

1886 births
1957 deaths
People from Uddevalla Municipality
Swedish male épée fencers
Swedish male modern pentathletes
Olympic fencers of Sweden
Olympic modern pentathletes of Sweden
Modern pentathletes at the 1912 Summer Olympics
Fencers at the 1928 Summer Olympics
Sportspeople from Västra Götaland County
20th-century Swedish people